Jaroslava Adamová (15 March 1925 – 16 June 2012) was a Czech film, theater and voice over actress. Her professional career lasted more than sixty years, spanning Czechoslovakia and the Czech Republic. Adamová provided the Czech language voice dubbing for many international film actresses, including Jeanne Moreau, Sophia Loren, and Meryl Streep.

Adamová received the Thalia Award for theater in 1996. Czech President Václav Havel awarded Adamová the Medal of Merit in 2001.

Adamová died in Prague on 16 June 2012 at the age of 87.

References

External links

1925 births
2012 deaths
Czech film actresses
Czech stage actresses
Czech television actresses
Czech voice actresses
Recipients of Medal of Merit (Czech Republic)
Merited Artists of Czechoslovakia
Actresses from Prague
Recipients of the Thalia Award